
Gmina Dobrzyca is a rural gmina (administrative district) in Pleszew County, Greater Poland Voivodeship, in west-central Poland.

Villages
Gmina Dobrzyca contains the villages and settlements of Czarnuszka, Dobrzyca, Dobrzyca-Nowy Świat, Fabianów, Galew, Gustawów, Izbiczno, Karmin, Karminek, Karminiec, Koźminiec, Lutynia, Nowy Karmin, Polskie Olędry, Ruda, Sośnica, Sośniczka, Strzyżew, Trzebin and Trzebowa.

Neighbouring gminas
Gmina Dobrzyca is bordered by the gminas of Jarocin, Kotlin, Koźmin Wielkopolski, Krotoszyn, Pleszew, Raszków and Rozdrażew.

References
Polish official population figures 2006

Dobrzyca
Pleszew County